State Route 59 (SR 59) is a  state highway in Baldwin and Monroe counties in the southwestern portion of the U.S. state of Alabama. The highway extends from Gulf Shores on the Gulf of Mexico coast to Uriah in rural southwestern Alabama.

Route description
The route begins at a junction with SR 21 in Uriah. The route maintains an east-to-west route for about ten miles until it reaches Georgetown. Here it turns north-to-south. The route continues south until it crosses into Baldwin County. 

It reaches Bay Minette and junctions with SR 225, and eventually I-65 at mile 34. The route then continues south to SR 287, also known as the Gulf Shores Parkway. That route is an effective route for people heading to Montgomery and beyond from Gulf Shores. The routes swap right-of-ways and SR 59 continues along the Gulf Shores Parkway. The route reaches US 31 soon. The two routes engage in a concurrency to Stapleton. US 31 splits off from SR 59 and heads towards Mobile. SR 59 continues downwards to Loxley, where it junctions with I-10 at a Parclo Interchange at exit 44. 

It then engages with a much shorter concurrency with US 90 (much shorter than its concurrency with US 31). The route continues south to Foley, which is home to its notable junction with the Foley Beach Express access road and its other notable junction with US 98. 

After passing by The Park at OWA and a Lambert's Cafe, the route makes a short journey south to the Pelican Place at Craft Farms. Just past that point, the route makes a slight curve and The Track Family Fun Center comes into play, a small entertainment complex. Immediately after that junction, the road crosses Portage Creek into Gulf Shores. Here, Waterville USA, the famous Blalock Seafood store, and Lulu's Seafood, plus multiple high-rise condominiums come into view. The route junctions with SR 180 and hits the last stretch of regular stores in the area before reaching SR 182, also known as the famous Alabama's Coastal Connection, which is its southern terminus.

Major intersections

See also

References

Rand McNally: The Road Atlas 2002, Rand McNally and Company 2001

External links

Southeastroads.com web page on SR-59 with photos
Alabama Department of Transportation county road maps for Baldwin and Monroe (Adobe Acrobat reader required for maps; enlargement of maps necessary for legibility)

059
Transportation in Baldwin County, Alabama
Transportation in Monroe County, Alabama